Orange is a city and the county seat of Orange County, Texas, United States. As of the 2020 census, the city population was 19,324. Orange is part of the Beaumont−Port Arthur Metropolitan Statistical Area. Founded in 1836, it is a deep-water port to the Gulf of Mexico.

History
This community was originally called Greens Bluff after a man named Resin Green, a Sabine River boatman, who arrived at this location sometime before 1830. A short time later, in 1840, the town was renamed Madison in honor of President James Madison.
To resolve the frequent post-office confusion with another Texas community called Madisonville, the town was renamed "Orange" in 1858. The area experienced rapid growth in the late 19th century due to 17 sawmills within the city limits, making Orange the center of the Texas lumber industry. Orange's growth led to the arrival of many immigrants in the late 19th century, including a moderately sized Jewish population by 1896.  In 1898, the county built a courthouse in the city, which later burned down and was replaced by the Orange County Courthouse.

The harbor leading into the Port of Orange was dredged in 1914 to accommodate large ships. Ship building during World War I contributed to the growth in population and economy. The Great Depression, not surprisingly, affected the city negatively, and the local economy was not boosted again until World War II.  A U.S. Naval Station was installed and additional housing was provided for thousands of defense workers and servicemen and their families. The population increased to just over 60,000 residents.  was the first of 300 ships of various types built in Orange during the war.

After the war, the peace-time population decreased to about 35,000.  At this time, the Navy Department announced it had selected Orange as one of eight locations where it would store reserve vessels. The area of the shipyards provided a favorable location, as the Sabine River furnished an abundant supply of fresh water to prevent saltwater corrosion.
Also during this period, the local chemical plants expanded, which boosted the economy. The chemical industry continues today as a leading source of revenue to the area.  The U.S. Naval Station became a Naval Inactive Ship Maintenance Facility in December 1975, retained 18.5 acres as a Navy and Marine Corps Reserve Center, but decommissioned the center completely in September 2008.

The city of Orange sustained a direct hit from Hurricane Rita in 2005, causing damage to the ship. The city decreed that the ship be moved because, as it claimed, the city needed the dock space. Orleck was not allowed to return to the port due to politics (as the city council was wanting the ship cut up and sold for scrap and had a long-running feud with the Restoration Association), so a new location was sought, including one in Arkansas and Lake Charles, Louisiana, for a new home. On May 6, 2009, the Lake Charles city council voted in favor of an ordinance authorizing the city to enter into a "Cooperative Endeavor Agreement" with USS Orleck. On May 20, 2010, the ship was moved to Lake Charles. The grand opening was on April 10, 2011.

Hurricane Ike
Orange was heavily damaged by Hurricane Ike on September 13, 2008. Damage was widespread and severe across Orange County.   The  storm surge breached the city's levees, caused catastrophic flooding and damage throughout the city. The storm surge traveled up the Neches River to also flood Rose City.

Orange received winds at hurricane force. Nearly the entire city of 19,000 people was flooded, from 6 in (15 cm) to 15 ft (4.5 m). The mayor of the city said about 375 people, of those who stayed behind during the storm, began to emerge, some needing food, water, and medical care. Many dead fish littered streets and properties. Three people were found dead in Orange County on September 29.

Hurricane Harvey

Orange once again fell victim to widespread flooding when Hurricane Harvey hit the city on August 29, 2017. The flood waters were mostly caused by the rising of the nearby Sabine River, which forms the border between Texas and Louisiana, and its many tributaries. The flooding from Harvey was due to extreme rainfall (50" to 60" in 48 hours) that fell after the storm's landfall, leaving 65% of the county under water. The Sabine did not rise until three days after the storm, when the flood gates of the Toledo Bend Reservoir were opened.

Media

Newspapers
 ''The Orange Leader (semi-weekly)

Geography

Orange is located at  (30.109217, –93.759133).

Climate
Orange has a humid subtropical climate. Winters are mild and rainy, while summers are hot, humid, and wet. The climate is similar to nearby Vinton, Louisiana, and Beaumont, Texas. The record high in Orange is  recorded August 10, 1962. The record low is  recorded December 26, 1983.

Demographics

As of the 2020 United States census, there were 19,324 people, 7,196 households, and 4,999 families residing in the city.

2010 Census data
As of the census of 2010,  18,595 people, 7,585 households, and 5,021 families resided in the city.  The population density was 872.7 people per square mile (336.9/km).  The 8,868 housing units averaged 441.7 per square mile (170.5/km).  The racial makeup of the city was 60.9% White, 33.2% African American, 0.3% Native American, 1.7% Asian, 1.08% from other races, and 2.0% from two or more races. Hispanics or Latinos of any race were 5.2% of the population. The average household size was 2.41.

In Orange, the population is distributed as 27.4% under the age of 18, 8.7% from 18 to 24, 26.5% from 25 to 44, 21.7% from 45 to 64, and 15.8% who were 65 years of age or older. The median age was 36 years. For every 100 females, there were 92.4 males. For every 100 females age 18 and over, there were 86.2 males. The median income for a household in the city was $29,519, and for a family was $37,473. Males had a median income of $37,238 versus $21,445 for females. The per capita income for the city was $16,535. About 20.5% of families and 22.9% of the population were below the poverty line, including 34.0% of those under age 18 and 16.0% of those age 65 or over' 20.3% of the population was below the poverty line, compared to 15.1% of the national population.

Government and infrastructure
The Texas Department of Criminal Justice  operates the Orange District Parole Office in Orange.
The city operates under the council-manager form of government.

Education
The City of Orange is served by the Little Cypress-Mauriceville Consolidated Independent School District, the West Orange-Cove Consolidated Independent School District, and the Orangefield Independent School District.

Lamar State College-Orange is a community college and part of the Texas State University System.

Culture
The City of Orange hosts several cultural attractions.  The Stark Museum of Art houses one of the finest collections of 19th- and 20th-century Western American art and artifacts in the country. The collection focuses on the land, people, and wildlife of the American West. The museum also holds a significant collection of American Indian art, as well as collections of glass and porcelain, and rare books and manuscripts. The museum features the work of artists such as artist/naturalist John James Audubon, Paul Kane, Albert Bierstadt, Thomas Moran, and John Mix Stanley.

The W. H. Stark House is a careful restoration of an 1894 Victorian home, typical of a wealthy Southeast Texas family. The 15-room, three-storied structure with its many gables, galleries, and distinctive windowed turret, shows the influence of several architectural styles.

The First Presbyterian Church on Green Avenue is a strong example of the classic Greek Revival architecture. Completed in 1912, it was the first air-conditioned public building west of the Mississippi River and its dome is the only opalescent glass dome in the United States.

The Confederate Memorial of the Wind is being built on private land at the intersection of Interstate 10 and Martin Luther King Jr Drive.

Transportation
Orange is served by Interstate 10, as well as a deep-water seaport. Commercial aviation service is located at nearby Southeast Texas Regional Airport, and general aviation service is provided by Orange County Airport.

Orange has the distinction of having exit 880 on Interstate 10 within its city limits, which is the highest numbered exit and mile marker on an interstate highway or freeway in North America.

Notable people

 Bonnie Baker, singer
 Marcia Ball, singer
 Michael Berry
 Clarence "Gatemouth" Brown
 Edgar William Brown, business leader and philanthropist
 Matt Bryant
 Chris Cole, American football player
 John Oliver Creighton
 Shane Dronett
 Clyde D. Eddleman
 Frances Fisher
 Donovan Gans
 Greg Hill, American football player
 Charles Holcomb
 Bobby Kimball
 Danny Klam
 Chuck Knipp
 Ernie Ladd, American football player and professional wrestler
 Janette Sebring Lowrey
 Henry J. Lutcher, lumber baron
 Jason Mathews
 Haskell Monroe
 Danielle Panabaker
 Kay Panabaker
 John Patterson, baseball player
 Bum Phillips, American football coach
 Wade Phillips, American football coach
 Andre Robertson, baseball player
 Chad Shelton, opera singer
 R.C. Slocum, American football player and coach
 Bubba Smith, American football player
 Kevin Smith, American football player
 Tody Smith
 William Henry Stark, business leader and philanthropist
 Lee Stringer
 Earl Thomas, American football player
 Deionte Thompson, American football player
 Liz Wickersham, television writer and producer

References

External links

 City Website
 Lamar State College-Orange
 The Orange Leader

 
Cities in Texas
Cities in Orange County, Texas
Hurricane Ike
Cities in the Beaumont–Port Arthur metropolitan area
County seats in Texas
1830 establishments in Mexico
Populated places established in 1830
Populated coastal places in Texas